Black Sunday may refer to:

Events

Natural disasters
Black Sunday, a day of major bushfires in Victoria, Australia during the 1925–26 Victorian bushfire season
Black Sunday (storm), a 1935 dust storm that swept across the Midwestern United States during the Dust Bowl
Black Sunday, a 1938 event of extraordinary surf conditions at Bondi Beach, Sydney, Australia
Black Sunday (1955), a series of bushfires in South Australia
Black Sunday (1963), the deadliest lightning strike on record involving Pan Am Flight 214, or The Clipper Tradewind, a Boeing 707-121 that crashed in Maryland on 8 December 1963.
Black Sunday, the day of the deadly 1967 Iowa–Minnesota tornado outbreak
Black Sunday, the evening the deadliest single tornado in to ever hit the US State of Missouri, the 2011 Joplin Tornado

Warfare and terrorism
Black Sunday, the 1918 attack of SM U-151 against U.S. ships off the coast of New Jersey
Black Sunday, 1937, an Irgun attack on November 14 in Jerusalem
Black Sunday, a 1943 event where 53 USAAF aircraft and 660 aircrewmen were lost during Operation Tidal Wave
Bus massacre, also known as Black Sunday, the 1975 clashes in Beirut that started the Lebanese Civil War
Black Sunday, the first day of the Siege of Sadr City (2004–2007) during the Iraq War

Other events
Black Sunday, the 1955 opening day of Disneyland Park
Black Sunday, the 1982 cancellation of the Colony Shale Oil Project
Black Sunday, the 1984 victory by the Los Angeles Raiders in Super Bowl XVIII
Black Sunday, the 1998 failure of the Denver International Airport Automated Guideway Transit System
Black Sunday, the 2001 death of Dale Earnhardt
Black Sunday (2005), a day when three New York City firefighters were killed in two fires
Black Sunday, the 2020 Calabasas helicopter crash that killed Kobe Bryant and his daughter Gianna, alongside seven other people.

Music
Black Sunday (Cypress Hill album) (1993)
Black Sunday (Sutter Kain & Donnie Darko album) (2005)
"Black Sunday", a song by Black Label Society from Order of the Black
"Black Sunday", a song by Coheed and Cambria from album Vaxis – Act I: The Unheavenly Creatures
"Black Sunday", a song by Cold from Year of the Spider
"Black Sunday", a song by Espen Lind from This Is Pop Music
"Black Sunday", a song by Jag Panzer from album Ample Destruction
"Black Sunday", a song by Jethro Tull from A

Other uses
Black Sunday (1960 film), an Italian horror film
Black Sunday (novel), a 1975 novel by Thomas Harris
Black Sunday (1977 film), an American film adaptation of the novel

See also
Black mass
Black Sabbath (disambiguation)
Bloody Sunday (disambiguation)

Black days